The Daily Democrat is the daily newspaper in Woodland, California and Yolo County, California. The paper is owned by Digital First Media.  Its headquarters are located in Woodland on Main Street in Woodland's Historic Downtown. It has four reporters and editors on staff.

History
The Daily Democrat was owned by the Leake family from 1891 to 1984, when it was sold to the Donrey 
Media Group. Donrey ceded control of the paper to the California Newspapers Partnership in 1999.

The paper was bought and is currently owned by Digital First Media.

Coverage
Much of the paper's local coverage is concentrated on Woodland and many unincorporated communities in Yolo County. It is widely available through much of Yolo County.

References

External links

1857 establishments in California
Daily newspapers published in California
MediaNews Group publications
Publications established in 1857
Woodland, California
Yolo County, California